Innisfail State High School (ISHS) is one of two high schools situated in Innisfail, Queensland, Australia.

The school had students from Year 8 to Year 12. The school was established in 1955 and its motto was Honor Et Labore which means "Honor and Labour".  2009 marked the final year of ISHS, the site being abandoned following extensive damage done by cyclone Larry, as the school is now called Innisfail State College, situated in Flying Fish Point road.

Notable alumni
Billy Slater Former Rugby league player for the Melbourne Storm 2003-2018. Qld Origin player 2004-2018. Australian Player 2008-2017 and current Qld Origin coach.
Ty Williams Former Rugby league player for the North Queensland Cowboys between 2002-2010. Qld Origin player in 2005.
Brent Cockbain former Wales rugby union player

References

Public high schools in Queensland
Schools in Far North Queensland
Buildings and structures in Innisfail, Queensland
Educational institutions established in 1955
1955 establishments in Australia
2009 disestablishments in Australia
Educational institutions disestablished in 2009